Leonardo Álvarez Alanís (born 24 September 1978) is a Mexican football manager and former player.

References

External links
 

1978 births
Living people
Association football defenders
Alacranes de Durango footballers
Mexican football managers
Footballers from Nuevo León
Sportspeople from Monterrey
Ascenso MX players
Mexican footballers